Evgeny Smirnov, better known by his stage name Omnia, is a Ukrainian DJ and music producer, born May 18, 1987 in Donetsk. His music is a blend of trance and progressive house sounds. He has been included twice in the DJ Mag Top 100 DJs poll.

Career
Omnia recorded a number of hit singles, including "The Fusion", "The Light", and "For The First Time". He also produced remixes for Armin van Buuren, Markus Schulz, Gareth Emery, Krewella, Cosmic Gate, Andrew Rayel, Arty and Mat Zo.

As a DJ, Omnia has performed at A State Of Trance (ASOT), South West Four and Electronic Family. He also performed at concert and event venues in a number of countries, including Ushuaia, Amnesia and Privilege in Ibiza, Papaya in Croatia, Ministry Of Sound UK, Zouk Singapore, Octagon Seoul, Exchange LA, and Avalon Hollywood.

Omnia also hosts a monthly radio show called the 'Omnia Music Podcast' where he experiments with musical styles and podcasts original sounds from around the world.

Discography 
Releases adapted from Beatport.

2020
 Omnia — "NVRLND" 
 Omnia — "Bloom"
 Omnia — "Generation"

2019

 Omnia and Whiteout — "U" 

2018
Markus Schulz & Omnia & Seri — "Road of No Return"
Omnia featuring Robin Vane – "Guide You Home"
Omnia and Danyka Nadeau — "For You"
Roman Messer and Betsie Larkin — "Unite" (Omnia Remix)
Omnia – "Cyberpunk"
Lange and Sarah Howells – "Out Of The Sky" (Omnia Remix)
Omnia and Ben Gold – "The Conquest"
Omnia and Drym – "Ethereal"
Omnia and Alex Sonata – "Titans"
Roman Messer and Betsie Larkin - "Unite" (Omnia Remix)

2017:
Raz Nitzan and Maria Nayler – "Nothing Breaks Like A Heart" (Omnia Remix)
Yan Space featuring Christian Burns – "Planet Earth" (Omnia Remix)
Omnia and Cathy Burton – "Searchlight"
Raz Nitzan and Maria Nayler - Nothing Breaks Like A Heart (Omnia Remix)
Ben Gold and Omnia – "The Gateway"
Omnia featuring Danyka Nadeau – "Hold On To You"
Giuseppe Ottaviani and Kyler England – Firefly (Omnia Remix)
Omnia and DRYM – "Enigma"
Omnia featuring Jonny Rose – "Why Do You Run"

2016:

Armin van Buuren featuring Sarah Decourcy – "Face Of Summer" (Omnia Remix)
Omnia – "Hold Me"
Omnia – "Ultra"
Omnia featuring Christian Burns – "All I See Is You"
Omnia and Audrey Gallagher – "I Believe"
Omnia – "Mystique"
Omnia – "Alien"

2015:

Omnia – "Shanghai"
Omnia featuring Tilde – "For The First Time"
Omnia and Luke Bond – "Reflex"
Andrew Rayel – Impulse (Omnia Remix)

2014:

Omnia featuring Jonny Rose – "Two Hands"
Omnia – "Tomorrow People"
Gareth Emery and Krewella – Lights and Thunder (Omnia remix)

2013:

Omnia featuring Everything By Electricity – "Bones"
Omnia – "Immersion"
Ronski Speed featuring Lucy Saunders – Rise Again (Omnia Remix)
Omnia – "The Light"

2012:

Cosmic Gate featuring Emma Hewitt – Calm Down (Omnia Remix)
Omnia – "Infina"
Omnia featuring Ana Criado – "No One Home"
Ashley Wallbridge featuring Audrey Gallagher – Bang the Drum (Omnia Remix)
Omnia featuring Cathy Burton – "Hearts Connected"
Omnia and IRA – "The Fusion"
Omnia featuring Melissa Loretta – Halo"

2011:

Arty and Mat Zo – Rebound (Omnia Remix)
Andy Moor Vs M.I.K.E. – Spirits Pulse (Omnia Remix)
Boom Jinx featuring Justine Suissa – Phoenix From The Flames (Omnia and The Blizzard Remix)
Markus Schulz featuring Ana Criado – Surreal (Omnia Remix)
Omnia pres. Ain Mo – "The Tune"
Omnia pres. Ain Mo – "Plug & Play"
The Blizzard and Omnia – "My Inner Island"

2010:

Smart Apes Vs Anna Lee featuring Kate Miles – Perfect 2011 (Omnia Vocal Mix)
Omnia and The Blizzard featuring Susana – "Closer"
The Blizzard and Omnia – "Metanoia"

2009:

Ron Hagen and Pascal M – Riddles In The Sand (Omnia Remix)
Sequentia featuring Per Linden – Undiscovered (Omnia Remix)
Monogato – Miami Vibe (Omnia Remix)
Armin van Buuren featuring Jacqueline Govaert – Never Say Never (Omnia Remix)
Omnia – "Stick In Monday"

2008:
Orjan Nilsen – La Guitarra (Omnia Remix)
Teya – Only You (Omnia Remix)
In Progress and Omnia – "Air Flower"
In Progress – Avalanche (Omnia Remix)

References

External links
Omnia official website

Ukrainian electronic musicians
Ukrainian trance musicians
1987 births
Living people
Musicians from Donetsk